Esmeralda Negrón (born 15 January 1983) is an American-born Puerto Rican retired footballer and current coach. She has been a member of the Puerto Rico women's national team. She was voted the second greatest Princeton University female athlete of the decade (2000–2010) for her time leading Princeton University women's soccer team.

Early life
A native of Harrington Park, New Jersey, Negrón attended Northern Valley Regional High School at Old Tappan.

College career 
Princeton made the NCAA tournament in all four seasons Negrón was on the team, advancing to the second round in her freshman season of 2001. During her days at Princeton, Negrón scored 47 goals as part of her 112 career points, both Princeton records for both the men's and women's programs. The unforgettable season of 2004 saw Negrón score 20 goals with 12 assists for a total of 52 points, all Princeton single-season records, leading the Tigers to the NCAA Division I Women's Soccer Championship semifinals. She was a 2004 first-team All-America, a 2003 third-team All-America, a two-time Ivy League  Player of the Year and a three-time first-team All-Ivy League selection. She won the von Kiensbusch Award her senior year as Princeton's top senior sportswoman.

Her Princeton career concluded with a record-breaking run to the NCAA Final Four in 2004 with then freshman teammate Diana Matheson, a member of the Canadian National Team.  No other any Ivy League team has ever reached the NCAA Final Four of a 64-team tournament.

Club career
Negrón played professionally for the New Jersey Lady Stallions and New Jersey Wildcats of the USL W-League.

International career
During the summer of 2004, Negrón played internationally with the United States U-21 team in Iceland and was a member of the pool for the full U.S. National Soccer Team. However, in 2010, she played officially for Puerto Rico at senior level.

International goals
Scores and results list Puerto Rico's goal tally first

Coaching career 
Negrón served as Assistant Coach for Seton Hall University and Princeton University women's soccer programs. After serving as Assistant Coach during Princeton's second Ivy League perfect season and second-best NCAA appearance of reaching the Round of 32, Negrón founded her own soccer training academy, Champions League Soccer Academy.

References 

1983 births
Living people
Women's association football forwards
Puerto Rican women's footballers
Puerto Rico women's international footballers
Competitors at the 2010 Central American and Caribbean Games
Puerto Rican expatriate women's footballers
Puerto Rican expatriate sportspeople in France
Expatriate women's footballers in France
Puerto Rican expatriate sportspeople in Germany
American women's soccer players
Northern Valley Regional High School at Old Tappan alumni
Soccer players from New Jersey
Sportspeople from Bergen County, New Jersey
People from Harrington Park, New Jersey
Princeton Tigers women's soccer players
New Jersey Lady Stallions players
New Jersey Wildcats players
American expatriate women's soccer players
American expatriate sportspeople in France
American expatriate soccer players in Germany
American sportspeople of Puerto Rican descent